Iavej is a town and former Rajput petty princely state on Saurashtra peninsula, in Gujarat, western India.

History 
The petty princely state, in Gohelwar  prant, was ruled by Sarvaiya Rajput Chieftains.

In 1901 it comprised two villages, with a population of 979, yielding 5,200 Rupees state revenue (1903-4, mostly from land), paying 290 Rupees tribute, to the Gaikwar Baroda State and to Junagadh State.

References

External links and Sources 
 Imperial Gazetteer, on DSAL.UChicago.edu - Kathiawar

Princely states of Gujarat